Digital projection may refer to:
 Digital cinema projectors, used in movie theatres for public exhibition
 Video projectors, generally used in home theatres and offices